Iron bis(diethyldithiocarbamate) is a coordination complex with the formula  where Et = . A red solid, it is representative of several ferrous dithiocarbamates with diverse substituents in place of ethyl. In terms of structure, the species is dimeric, consisting of two pentacoordinate iron(II) centers.

Reactions
The complex reacts with a variety of reagents with concomitant formation of mono-iron derivatives. 9,10-Phenanthroline adds to iron bis(diethyldithiocarbamate) to give the blue-octahedral complex . 3,4-Bis(trifluoromethyl)-1,2-dithiete reacts to give the dithiolene complex . Nitric oxide and carbon monoxide to give the nitrosyl complex  and the carbonyl complex , respectively.

Related compounds
 Iron tris(diethyldithiocarbamate)

References

Iron compounds
ison